Cavriglia is a comune (municipality) in the province of Arezzo in the Italian region Tuscany, located about  southeast of Florence and about  west of Arezzo.

Cavriglia borders the following municipalities: Figline Valdarno, Gaiole in Chianti, Greve in Chianti, Montevarchi, Radda in Chianti, San Giovanni Valdarno.

Sister cities
Cavriglia is twinned with the following town:
  La Chapelle-Saint-Mesmin, France
  Mellieħa, Malta (since 2007)
  Mohyliv-Podilskyi, Ukraine

References

External links

 Official website

Cities and towns in Tuscany